George Richards (February 6, 1872 – January 9, 1948) was an American officer born at Ironton, Ohio and serving in the United States Marine Corps during the Boxer Rebellion. He was one of 23 Marine Corps officers approved to receive the Marine Corps Brevet Medal for bravery.

Biography
He was born on February 6, 1872. In 1891 Richards graduated from the United States Naval Academy in Annapolis, Maryland. He retired March 1, 1936 as a Major General after over 40 years of service and died January 9, 1948.

Awards
Brevet Medal
Distinguished Service Medal
Sampson Medal
Spanish Campaign Medal
China Relief Expedition Medal
Philippine Campaign Medal
Cuban Pacification Medal
World War I Victory Medal
Officer, Legion of Honor (France)

Presidential citation for the Brevet Medal
Citation:
The President of the United States takes pleasure in presenting the Marine Corps Brevet Medal to George Richards, Major, U.S. Marine Corps, for distinguished conduct in the presence of the enemy at the battle of Tientsin, China, on the 13th day of July 1900. On 15 June 1901, appointed Lieutenant Colonel, by brevet.

Secretary of the Navy citation for the Brevet Medal
Citation
The Secretary of the Navy takes pleasure in transmitting to Major George Richards, United States Marine Corps, the Brevet Medal which is awarded in accordance with Marine Corps Order No. 26 (1921), for distinguished conduct in the presence of the enemy while serving as Paymaster, Colonel Robert L. Meade's Marine Regiment, at the battle of Tientsin, China, on 13 July 1900. On 15 June 1901, Major Richards is appointed Lieutenant Colonel, by brevet, to take rank from 13 July 1900.

Navy Distinguished Service Medal citation
The President of the United States of America takes pleasure in presenting the Navy Distinguished Service Medal to Brigadier General George Richards, United States Marine Corps, for exceptionally meritorious service in a duty of great responsibility in the organization and administration of the Paymaster's Department of the Marine Corps during World War I. Through his energy and efficient management this Department was able successfully to meet the greatly increased burdens and responsibility placed upon it.

See also

References

General
 
 
 
 

Specific

1872 births
1948 deaths
United States Marine Corps generals
United States Marine Corps personnel of World War I
American military personnel of the Spanish–American War
American military personnel of the Philippine–American War
People from Ironton, Ohio
United States Naval Academy alumni
Recipients of the Navy Distinguished Service Medal